Back Creek is a small rural locality in the Gwydir Shire, part of the New England region of New South Wales, Australia.

References

Towns in New South Wales
Towns in New England (New South Wales)